Susan Nussbaum (12 December 1953 – 28 April 2022) was an American actress, author, playwright, and disability rights activist.

References

1953 births
2022 deaths
American actresses
American women dramatists and playwrights
American disability rights activists